Chance Harbour   is a community in the Canadian province of Nova Scotia, located in  Pictou County. It is situated 90 minutes from both Halifax and the scenic Cabot Trail and 30 minutes from the Caribou-Wood Islands Ferry. It is home to Melmerby Beach Provincial Park.

Navigator

References
Chance Harbour on Destination Nova Scotia

Communities in Pictou County